Ebrahimali Abubacker Siddiq (born 1937) is an Indian agricultural scientist, whose research in genetics and plant breeding is reported to have assisted in the development of various high-yielding rice varieties such as dwarf basmati and hybrid rice. The government of India honoured Siddiq in 2011 with the fourth-highest civilian award of Padma Shri.

Biography

E. A. Siddiq was born in 1937 in Ilayangudi, Small Town in Sivaganga District, Tamil Nadu, India. His graduate studies were completed in Botany (1959) from the University of Madras following which he obtained masters (1964) and doctoral degrees (1968) in Cytogenetics, under the supervision of renowned botanist, M. S. Swaminathan, from the Indian Agricultural Research Institute (IARI). His career started at his alma mater, the Indian Agricultural Research Institute, as a cytogeneticist in 1968, a post he held till 1976 when he was promoted as the Senior Scientist. In 1983, he was deputed to Egypt as the Rice Breeder and in 1986, he was transferred to Philippines as the Professor of Genetics. The next year, in 1987, he returned to India as the Project Director of the Directorate of Rice Research, Hyderabad and worked there till 1994. The next move was to Indian Council of Agricultural Research (ICAR), New Delhi as the Deputy Director General of the Crop Science Division.

In 1997 Siddiq was honored as the National Professor of ICAR and in 2002, he took charge of the Centre for DNA Fingerprinting and Diagnostics (CDFD) as the Distinguished Chair. On his retirement in 2007, he was appointed as the Adjunct Scientist at CFFD. He also holds the positions of Adjunct Professor of the University of Hyderabad, Adjunct Professor of the Indian Agricultural Research Institute (IARI) and the Honorary Professor of Biotechnology at Acharya NG Ranga Agricultural University, Hyderabad.

Positions
Siddiq was a member of the scientific advisory council of the Prime Minister of India from 2004 to 2009. He sits in the Board of Members of the International Rice Research Institute as well as the Executive Committee of the Agri Biotech Foundation. He was a member of the working group for the Eleventh Five Year Plan (2007-2012) of India. He was also a member of the Research Advisory Committee of the National Research Centre on Plant Biotechnology, an Indian Council of Agricultural Research (ICAR) subsidiary.

Siddiq is the chairman of the Farm and Rural Science Foundation of The Federation of Andhra Pradesh Chambers of Commerce and Industry. He also served as a council member of National Science academy, India from 1998 till 2000.

Legacy
Siddiq is credited with contributions on the scientific, academic and organizational fronts. His research primarily focusses on genetic research and applied breeding of rice, for improving the yield and quality, and is reported to have assisted in the development of ten high-yielding rice varieties. A variety of dwarf basmati rice (Pusa Basmati-1), claimed to be the first high-yielding variety in its class, and quick maturing varieties such as Pusa 2-21, Pusa 33, Pusa 4 and Pusa 834 are credited to Siddiq. His contribution is also reported in the development of DRRH-1, a first-generation Indian hybrid. Siddiq has also done basic research on adaptability, stability and the potential of convergent breeding of various rice breeds. His research has also covered the cytogenetic and phylogenetic aspects of rice breeding.

Siddiq was a part of the project for enhancement of rice research in Egypt, under the USAID-funded Rice Breeder programme of International Rice Research Institute (IRRI) in 1987 as well as in the establishment of the Government of India-sponsored National Rice Research Institute in Vietnam. Working as a consultant for the World Bank, he has designed the projects for agricultural development in Assam and Bangladesh. He is credited with two scientific studies, one in Egypt and the other in India, in the capacity of the consultant to the Food and Agriculture Organization (FAO).

On the organizational front, Siddiq has collaborated with the World Bank/FAO as consultant and advisor and has prepared many project proposals for programs in Egypt, Sri Lanka, India, Indonesia and the Philippines. He has also helped in the establishment of rice research institutes in Vietnam and Bangladesh. He was a member of the Task Force on Crop Biotechnology, Monitoring and Evaluation Committee and the National Convenor of the Natural Rice Biotechnology Network during the period from 1990 to 2002.

Siddiq is credited with over 150 research publications, 16 of which have been listed by Microsoft Academic Search in their online repository and his research findings have been cited in many books and journals. 
 

He has supervised 35 students in their PhD studies and has delivered keynote addresses at many conferences.

Awards and recognitions
Siddiq has received several honors starting with the Hari Om Ashram Trust National Award in 1976. In 1981, he was awarded the VASVIK Industrial Research Award, followed by Amrik Singh Cheema Award in 1988, Silver Jubilee Medal from the Directorate of Rice Research (DRR) in 1990 and Om Prakash Bhasin Award in 1994. A year later, in 1995, he received the Borlaug Award and the Rafi Ahmed Kidwai Award. Indian National Science Academy honored Siddiq in 1997 with the Silver Jubilee Medal. He has also received the GP Chatterjee Memorial Lecture Award of the Indian Science Congress Association in 2001, the Agricultural Leadership Award in 2008 and appreciative mementos from the Government of Tamil Nadu and the Government of Egypt, besides receiving the Professor Sundar Lal Hora Medal of INSA, (2011) and B. P. Pal Memorial Award of National Academy of Agricultural Sciences (NAAS) (2011–12). In 2011, the Government of India included him in the Republic day honours, listing him for the fourth highest civilian award of Padma Shri.

Siddiq is an elected Fellow of the Indian National Science Academy (1995), National Academy of Sciences (India), Allahabad and National Academy of Agricultural Sciences, New Delhi.

See also

 International Rice Research Institute
 National Academy of Agricultural Sciences
 Directorate of Rice Research
 Indian Council of Agricultural Research
 Centre for DNA Fingerprinting and Diagnostics
 Acharya NG Ranga Agricultural University

References

External links
 
 
 

 

1937 births
Living people
Recipients of the Padma Shri in science & engineering
Scientists from Hyderabad, India
Indian agriculturalists
Fellows of the Indian National Science Academy
Fellows of The National Academy of Sciences, India
Indian geneticists
Fellows of the National Academy of Agricultural Sciences
20th-century Indian botanists
People from Sivaganga district